Urchagam is a 2007 Tamil romantic drama film directed by Ravichandran and starring Nandha and Sherin. The storyline is based on the problems and difficulties between a love marriage and arranged marriage. The movie was shot in Chennai, ECR, Puducherry, Goa, and Jothpur. About three songs were shot in Bangkok and its surroundings. Dinesh Lambha was introduced as the villain in this movie and Vivek also plays a prominent role in the movie.
Ranjit Barot wrote the film's music. The film was initially titled Coffee Shop, but in order to receive government funding, the producers gave it a Tamil name. It was dubbed into Hindi as Meri Jigar Meri Chahaat.

Plot
The film revolves around Jency (Sherin), a close friend of Ganesh (Nandha). When Ganesh decides to open his heart and express his love to her, she informs him that she is to be engaged to Nicholas (Dinesh Lamba), who is a rich entrepreneur in London. The film is somewhat similar to the Hindi film Humko Deewana Kar Gaye.

Nicholas sponsors Jency's mother's surgery. Knowing well that Nicholas is a jealous and sadistic youth, Jency decides to marry him as a token of gratitude. But life turns miserable for her between her engagement and her wedding. Ganesh steps in and saves her from all her troubles. Ganesh and Nicholas cross swords with each other.

Cast
 Nandha as Ganesh
 Sherin as Jency
 Vivek as Ayyanarkudi Raja
 Dinesh Lamba as Nicholas
 Vaiyapuri as Bhai
 Sampath Ram

Releases

Tracklist
The audio was released in April 2007.
"Kangal" - Zubeen Garg
"Veyyil" - Kunal Ganjawala
"Nanba Nanba" - Kunal Ganjawala
"Netru Vatcha" - Gayatri Ganjawala, Vijay Prakash
"Narum Pookkal" - Hariharan, Nandini Srikar

References

External links
 

2007 films
2000s Tamil-language films
Films scored by Ranjit Barot
Indian romantic drama films